There is only one known land reptile species native to Ireland, the viviparous or common lizard. It appears to have a widespread distribution across the entire island with coastal, bogland and mountainous areas showing highest numbers of sightings.

Five marine turtle species appear regularly off the west coast but do not come ashore. All are endangered, some critically. The pond turtle is introduced.

Subclass: Diapsida

Infraclass: Lepidosauromorpha

Superorder: Lepidosauria

Order: Squamata (lizards, snakes)

Suborder: Lacertilia (lizards)
Family: Lacertidae
Subfamily: Lacertinae
Genus: Zootoca
 Viviparous lizard, Zootoca vivipara 
Family: Anguidae
Subfamily: Anguinae
Genus: Anguis
 Slowworm, Anguis fragilis  (believed to be a more recent introduction, with confirmed sightings only in The Burren)

Order: Testudines (turtles)

Suborder: Cryptodira
Superfamily: Chelonioidea (sea turtles)
Family: Dermochelyidae
Genus: Dermochelys
 Leatherback sea turtle, Dermochelys coriacea 
Family: Cheloniidae
Genus: Chelonia
 Green sea turtle, Chelonia mydas 
Genus: Eretmochelys
 Hawksbill sea turtle, Eretmochelys imbricata 
Genus: Lepidochelys
 Kemp's ridley sea turtle, Lepidochelys kempii  Vagrant
Genus: Caretta
 Loggerhead sea turtle, Caretta caretta 
Superfamily: Testudinoidea (pond turtles)
Family: Emydidae
Genus: Trachemys
Pond slider, Trachemys scripta  Introduced

References 

King, G.L. and Berrow, S.D. (2009) Marine turtles in Irish waters. Special Supplement to the Irish Naturalists' Journal (30 pages)

External links 
 nationalgeographic.com: Snakeless in Ireland: Blame Ice Age, Not St. Patrick
 Turtles stranded in Ireland
 "Ireland Red List No.5 Amphibians, Reptiles & Freshwater Fish"

Reptiles
Ireland
Ireland
Ireland